Dirty Rotten Shame is an album by Ronnie Drew, released in 1995.

Drew left The Dubliners in 1995, after recording this album due to its high chart success in the Irish Charts. It has more of a rock music feel than his previous solo albums and features Aslan on backing vocals.

It was produced by Keith Donald, formerly of Moving Hearts and contains songs by Elvis Costello, Christy Moore and U2's Bono.

Track listing
 "Gardiner Street Blues" (Donal McDonald) - 5:16
 "Eurolations" (Donal McDonald) - 3:56
 "Do You Want My Job" (Ry Cooder) - 5:43
 "The Dunes" (Shane MacGowan)
 "One Last Cold Kiss" (Felix Pappalardi, Gail Collins) - 3:18
 "Dirty Rotten Shame" (Elvis Costello) - 3:44
 "Drinkin' in the Day" (Bono, Simon Carmody) - 4:46
 "Viva La Quinte Brigada" (Christy Moore) - 4:33
 "Happy As a Baby" (Mick Hanly) - 3:52
 "Far Off Fields" (Keith Donald) - 2:45
 "True Ron Ron" (Keith Donald) - 2:44
 "Brothers in Arms" (Mark Knopfler) - 4:40

Personnel
Ronnie Drew - guitar, vocals
Anthony Drennan - acoustic and electric guitar, Spanish guitar
Eoghan O'Neill - bass, 6-string bass, acoustic guitar
Keith Donald - saxophone, bass clarinet, soprano recorder
Máirtín O'Connor - button key accordion
Declan Masterson - Uilleann bagpipes, bouzouki, low whistle
Myles Drennan - drums, keyboards
Noel Eccles - percussion
Mick Nolan - trumpet, piccolo trumpet, flugelhorn
Aslan, Jenny Newman, Karen Hamill - backing vocals
Luke Slott - boy soprano

1995 albums
Ronnie Drew albums
Columbia Records albums